Roqués is an uninhabited village belonging to the Spanish city council of Nerpio (Albacete (province)), near to the most southern point of Castile-La Mancha.

Province of Albacete